Alina Șerban (born October 29, 1987) is the winner of Best Actress Award at the German Actors Guild Awards 2020 for her leading role in “Gipsy Queen”, a nominee for Best Actress of the German Film Award 2020,  the representative of Romania at The Cannes International Film Festival 2018 for her leading role in Alone at My Wedding and the first Roma woman theatre and film director of Romania.

The first one in her family to graduate high-school, she graduated from the Tisch School of the Arts in New York and obtained a master’s from Royal Academy of Dramatic Art in London. 

Șerban is known for writing and performing plays with social justice messages, against sexism, racism, homophobia and various other forms of discrimination

Biography
Alina Șerban  was born in 1987 in a Romanian Roma family in Bucharest, Romania. She was 8 years old when her parents lost their home and were forced to move to her father’s extended family. A few years later her mother went to prison and Alina spent her teenage years in a children's home from where she went directly to the university. She used her diaries from those years to write the early versions of I Declare at My Own Risk, Slumdog Roma and Two weeks, maximum one month, maybe six years – which she performed at the International Romani Art Festival in 2009 and 2010

In 2011 Serban received a scholarship and moved to London for a master’s program at the Royal Academy of Dramatic Art. The following year she received the "Best Romanian Student in the UK”, prize, but she could not afford the expenses associated with the trip from London to Edinburgh so she could not pick up the prize in person.

In March 2014 the actress was invited to the Street Child World Cup to give a speech in front of 2000 people at Royal Albert Hall. In 2016 Alina Serban published the first Collection of Roma Fairy Tales in Romania, as told by her aunt – Tanti Veta.

She played the lead role and contributed as a script consultant for three European film projects focusing on experiences of Roma women: ‘Written/Unwritten’, Alone at My Wedding and  ‘Gipsy Queen’. 

For her first leading role in cinema, Serban stars in Marta Bergman’s feature film Alone at My Wedding, which premiered at the Cannes International Film Festival in 2018 and earned her several Best Actress awards.

She also stars as a boxer in Huseyin Tabak’s ‘Gipsy Queen’, a German-Austrian production. For her performance in ‘Gipsy Queen’ she won the Best Actress Award at Tallinn Black Nights Film Festival 2019, the ‘Best Actress’ award at The German Actors Guild Awards and was nominated for the German Film Academy Award - LOLA.

In 2020, Alina Serban made her debut as a filmmaker with “Bilet de iertare”/“Letter of Forgiveness”- the first film about the Roma slavery written and directed from a Roma perspective. The short film was awarded a Special Mention for Best Romanian Short Film at Transilvania International Film Festival and Best Narrative Director at Female Voices Rock, USA.

Studies
2006-2009 National University of Theater and Film in Bucharest
2009 Tisch School of the Arts at New York University (Open Arts program)
2011-2012 Royal Academy of Dramatic Art in London (MA Theatre Lab program)

Theatre
Alina Serban became known on the alternative theater scene of Bucharest after the performance I Declare at My Own Risk, a one-woman-show she had also written. The play, inspired by the autobiographical story of the actress, was performed in many European countries, including Romania, Hungary, France and Italy

In 2013 Alina Serban performed I Declare at My Own Risk in Great Britain, at the Royal Academy of Dramatic Art – RADA Festival, followed by another performance at Tara Arts in 2014

While Living in London, in 2015, Alina Serban wrote “Home”, a play that tells a story of different immigrants looking for a better life in the UK. The play won “Stories of London” Rich Mix's competition

By the end of 2015, Serban performed in “Roma-Sapiens” in Berlin and was invited to present and perform I Declare at My Own Risk at the Stockholm Literature Festival

In 2016 Alina Serban writes, directs and performs in “The Great Shame”, a theater play that talks about 500 years of Roma slavery in the Romanian countries and in which she includes little known stories of slavery from historical documents

Other projects

Cinema

Television

References

External links 

 http://povestinespuse.eu/en/home/ 
 
 https://web.archive.org/web/20161030075809/http://www.agencesimpson.fr/spip.php?article390 
 https://www.youtube.com/watch?v=H7ZsuoLfy60

1987 births
Living people
Romanian film actresses
Romanian television actresses
Actresses from Bucharest
21st-century Romanian actresses
Romani actresses
Romanian Romani people